Turkish Airlines Flight 981 was a scheduled flight from Istanbul Yeşilköy Airport to London Heathrow Airport, with an intermediate stop at Orly Airport in Paris. On 3 March 1974, the McDonnell Douglas DC-10 operating the flight crashed into the Ermenonville Forest, outside Paris, killing all 346 people on board. The crash was also known as the Ermenonville air disaster. Flight 981 was the deadliest plane crash in aviation history until 27 March 1977, when 583 people perished in the collision of two Boeing 747s in Tenerife. It remained the deadliest single-aircraft accident until the crash of Japan Airlines Flight 123 on 12 August 1985, and the deadliest aviation accident without survivors until the Charkhi Dadri mid-air collision on 12 November 1996. It remains the deadliest single-aircraft accident without survivors, the first fatal and deadliest crash involving the McDonnell Douglas DC-10, the fifth deadliest aviation disaster altogether (including 9/11) and the deadliest aviation accident to occur in France. It is also the deadliest aviation accident that did not involve a Boeing 747 (not including 9/11).

The crash occurred when an incorrectly secured cargo door at the rear of the plane burst open and broke off, causing an explosive decompression that severed critical cables necessary to control the aircraft. To maximize the working space within the cargo hold, the cargo doors opened outwards, making them vulnerable to being forced open at high altitudes under normal in-flight pressure. To prevent this, a special latching system was used that locked shut under pressure when properly closed. To ensure the latches were properly positioned, a handle on the outside of the door pressed small metal pins into the latches; if the latches were in an improper location the pins would not align and the handle would not close.

In previous service, notably an incident that occurred on American Airlines Flight 96 in 1972, it had been noticed that it was possible to close the handle on DC-10 cargo doors despite the latches being in the wrong position. This was because the linkage between the handle and the pins was too weak and allowed the handle to be forced into the closed position. A minor change had been ordered to install a support plate for the handle linkage to make it stronger; manufacturer documents showed this work as completed on the aircraft involved in Flight 981, but the plate had not in fact been installed. It was also noted that the handle on the crash aircraft had been filed down at an earlier date to make it easier to close the door. Finally, the latching had been performed by a baggage handler who did not speak Turkish or English, the only languages provided on a warning notice about the cargo door's design flaws and the methods of compensating for them. After the disaster, the latches were redesigned and the locking system significantly upgraded.

In the following investigation, it was found that a similar set of conditions, which had caused the failure of an aircraft floor following explosive decompression of the cargo hold, had occurred in ground testing in 1970 before the DC-10 series entered commercial service. The smoking gun was a memo from the fuselage's manufacturer, Convair, to McDonnell Douglas, in which the series of events that occurred on Flight 96, and fatally on Flight 981, was foreseen; it concluded that if these events occurred it would probably result in the loss of the aircraft. In spite of this warning, nothing was done to correct the flaw. The consequences of this were many, including – but not limited to – some of the largest civil lawsuits to that date.

Aircraft and crew

It was powered by three General Electric CF6-6D turbofan engines. The plane was one of a group of five DC-10-10s owned by Mitsui, which intended to sell the planes to All Nippon Airways; however, the Japanese airline selected the Lockheed L-1011 TriStar, due to bribery by Lockheed. As a result, three of the planes went to Turkish Airlines and the remaining two went to Laker Airways.

The accident aircraft had 12 six-abreast first-class seats and 333 nine-abreast economy seats, for a total of 345 passenger seats. At the time of the accident, two people were seated in first class, while the economy class was fully occupied. The cockpit crew was Turkish. Flight 981's Captain was Nejat Berköz, age 44, with 7,000 flying hours. First Officer Oral Ulusman, age 38, had 5,600 hours of flying time. Flight Engineer Erhan Özer, age 37, had 2,120 flying hours experience.

Accident
Flight 981 departed from Istanbul at 07:57 local time and landed at Paris's Orly International Airport at 11:02 am local time, after a flight time of just over four hours. The aircraft was carrying 167 passengers and 11 crew members on its first leg, and 50 of these passengers disembarked in Paris. The flight's second leg, from Paris to London Heathrow Airport, was normally underbooked; however, due to a strike by British European Airways employees, and the indecisive result of the general election held in Britain earlier that week, many London-bound travelers, who had been stranded at Orly, were booked onto Flight 981, delaying the flight's departure by 30 minutes.

The aircraft left Orly Airport at 12:32, bound for Heathrow Airport, and took off in an easterly direction, before turning north. Shortly after takeoff, Flight 981 was cleared to flight level 230 and started turning west towards London. An air traffic controller noted that, as the flight was cleared to FL230, he had briefly seen a second echo on his radar that remained stationary behind the aircraft; this was likely the remains of the rear cargo door.

When the door blew off, the primary as well as both sets of backup control cables that ran beneath the section of floor that blew out were completely severed, destroying the pilots' ability to control the plane's elevators, rudder, and number two engine. The flight data recorder showed that the throttle for engine two snapped shut when the door failed. The loss of control of these key components resulted in the pilots losing control of the aircraft entirely.

The aircraft almost immediately attained a 20-degree pitch down and began picking up speed, while Captain Berköz and First Officer Ulusman struggled to regain control. At some point, one of the crew members pressed their microphone button broadcasting the pandemonium in the cockpit on the departure frequency. Controllers also picked up a distorted transmission from the plane and the aircraft's pressurization and overspeed warnings were heard over the pilots' words in Turkish, including the co-pilot saying, "the fuselage has burst!" As the plane's speed increased, the additional lift raised the nose again. Berköz was recorded calling out, "Speed!" and pushed the throttles forward in order to level off. Seventy-seven seconds after the cargo door gave way, the plane crashed into the trees of Ermenonville Forest, a state-owned forest at Dammartin's Grove in the commune of Fontaine-Chaalis, Oise. The wreckage was so fragmented that it was difficult to determine whether any parts of the aircraft were missing before it crashed. Post-crash fires were small because there were few large pieces of the aircraft left intact to burn. Of the 346 passengers and crew on board, only 188 bodies were identifiable (40 of which were identified visually), with rescue teams recovering some 20,000 body fragments in all.

Passengers and Crew

167 passengers flew on the Istanbul to Paris leg, and 50 of them disembarked in Paris. 216 new passengers, many of whom were supposed to fly on Air France, British European Airways, Pan Am, or TWA, boarded TK 981 in Paris, resulting in a 30-minute departure delay. Some passengers cancelled their tickets because of delays or a lack of seats.

The majority of the passengers were British, including members of an amateur rugby team from Bury St Edmunds, Suffolk, who were returning from a Five Nations match between France and England.  Notable people on board were Briton John Cooper, who won silver medals in the men's 400 meters hurdles and the 4 × 400 meters relay at the 1964 Summer Olympics in Tokyo, and Jim Conway, general secretary of the British Amalgamated Engineering and Electrical Union.

Investigation

The French Minister of Transport appointed a commission of inquiry by the Arrêté 4 March 1974 and included Americans because the aircraft was manufactured by an American company. There were many passengers on board from Japan and the United Kingdom, so observers from those countries followed the investigation closely.

The Lloyd's of London insurance syndicate that covered Douglas Aircraft retained Failure Analysis Associates (now Exponent, Inc.) to also investigate the accident. In the company's investigation, it was noted that during a stop in Turkey, ground crews had filed the cargo door's locking pins down to less than a quarter of an inch, when they experienced difficulty closing the door.

Cause

The passenger doors on the DC-10 are inward-opening plug doors, designed to prevent opening while the aircraft is pressurized. However, due to its large radius, a cargo hatch on the DC-10 could not open inside the fuselage without taking up valuable cargo space, so the hatch was designed to open outward, allowing cargo to be stored directly behind it. The outward-opening design presents the risk of the hatch being blown open by the pressure inside the cargo area if the latch were to fail during flight. To prevent this from happening, the DC-10 uses a latching system whose main security principle is an "over-center concept": four C-shaped latches mounted on a common torque shaft are rotated over latching pins ("spools") fixed to the aircraft fuselage. The rotating movement of the torque shaft is brought about by an electric actuator, through a linkage that includes a crankshaft that ensures the "over-center" position of the whole system. Due to the shape of the latches and the over-center design, when the latches are in the correct position, internal pressure on the hatch not only produces insufficient torque to open the hatch, but it also makes the whole system safer because the over-center safety principle is increased. The system has a hand crank provided as a backup.

To ensure this rotation was complete and the latches were in the proper position, the DC-10 cargo hatch design included a separate locking mechanism that consisted of small locking pins that slid behind flanges on the lock torque tube (which transferred the actuator force to the latch hooks through a linkage). When the locking pins were in place, any rotation of the latches would cause the torque tube flanges to contact the locking pins, making further rotation impossible. The pins were pushed into place by an operating handle on the outside of the hatch. If the latches were not properly closed, the pins would strike the torque tube flanges and the handle would remain open, visually indicating a problem. Additionally, the handle moved a metal plug into a vent cut in the outer hatch panel. If the vent was not plugged, the fuselage would not retain pressure, eliminating any pneumatic force on the hatch. Also, there was an indicator light in the cockpit, controlled by a switch actuated by the locking pin mechanism, that remained lit until the cargo hatch was correctly latched.

Similarities to American Airlines Flight 96

The cargo door design flaws, and the consequences of a likely aircraft floor failure in the event of in-flight decompression on the DC-10, had been noted by Convair engineer Dan Applegate in a 1972 memo. The memo was written after American Airlines Flight 96, being operated by another DC-10, experienced a rear cargo door failure similar to the one that occurred on Flight 981, also causing an explosive decompression. Fortunately, even though the pilots' ability to control Flight 96 was compromised by some severed underfloor cables in the damaged section of the plane, they were able to land in Detroit without further injuriesthough Applegate warned that a more severe outcome was likely when (not if) a similar incident happened on another DC-10.

The National Transportation Safety Board's (NTSB) investigation into Flight 96 determined that baggage handlers forced the locking handle closed, and the latches did not engage fully because of an electrical problem. The incident investigators discovered that the rod connecting the pins to the handle was weak enough that it could be bent with repeated operation and force, allowing the baggage handler to close the handle with his knee even when the pins interfered with the torque tube flanges. The vent plug and cockpit light were operated by the handle or the locking pins, not the latches, so, when the handle was stowed, both of these warning devices indicated that the door was properly closed. In the case of Flight 96, the plane was able to make a successful emergency landing because not all of the underfloor cables were severed, thus allowing the pilots limited control. This greatly contrasted with Flight 981, where all of the underfloor cables were severed in the decompression and the pilots completely lost control of the plane.

In the aftermath of Flight 96, the NTSB made several recommendations regarding the hatch design and the cabin floor. Primarily, it recommended the addition of vents in the rear cabin floor that would ensure that a cargo area decompression would equalize the cabin area, and not place additional load onto the floor. In fact, most of the DC-10's cabin floor had vents like these, only the rear section of the aircraft lacked them. Additionally, the NTSB recommended that upgrades to the locking mechanism and to the latching actuator electrical system be made compulsory. Despite this, the Federal Aviation Administration (FAA) did not issue an Airworthiness Directive requiring these changes, instead reaching a gentlemen's agreement with McDonnell-Douglas to make some lesser changes to the hatch and no changes to the floor.

The Flight 981 aircraft, registration TC-JAV (also known as "Ship 29"), had been ordered from McDonnell-Douglas three months after the service bulletin was issued, and was delivered to Turkish Airlines three months later. Despite this, the changes required by the service bulletin (installation of a support plate for the handle linkage, preventing the bending of the linkage seen in the Flight 96 incident) had not been implemented. Through either oversight or deliberate fraud, the manufacturer construction logs showed that this work had been carried out. In addition, an improper adjustment had later been made to the locking pin mechanism on the Flight 981 aircraft, causing the locking pin travel to be reduced. This meant that the pins did not extend past the torque tube flanges, allowing the handle to be closed without excessive force (estimated by investigators to be around ) despite the improperly engaged latches. These findings concurred with statements made by Mohammed Mahmoudi, the baggage handler who had closed the door on Flight 981; he noted that no particular amount of force was needed to close the locking handle. Changes had also been made to the warning light switch mechanism, the unintended consequence of which was that the cockpit warning light would be extinguished even though the latches were not fully in place.

After Flight 96, McDonnell-Douglas added a small peephole that allows baggage handlers to visually inspect the pins to confirm they were in the correct position, and information placards to show the correct and incorrect positions of the pins. This modification had been applied to Flight 981's plane; however, Mahmoudi had not been instructed about the purpose of the indicator window; he had been told that as long as the door latch handle stowed correctly and the vent flap closed at the same time, the door was safely latched. Furthermore, the instructions on the plane regarding the indicator window were printed in English and Turkish, but Algerian-born Mahmoudi, who was fluent in three other languages, could read neither of these.

It was normally the duty of the Turkish Airlines flight engineer or chief ground engineer to ensure that all cargo and passenger doors were securely closed before takeoff. In the case of Flight 981 however, the airline did not have a ground engineer on duty at the time of the departure, and the flight engineer for Flight 981 failed to check the door. Although French media outlets called for Mahmoudi to be arrested, the crash investigators stated that it was unrealistic to expect an untrained, low-wage earning baggage handler, who could not read the warning notice, to be responsible for the safety of the aircraft.

Aftermath

Issues related to the latch of the DC-10 include human factors, interface design and engineering responsibility. The control cables for the rear control surfaces of the DC-10 were routed under the floor; therefore, a failure of the hatch resulting in a collapse of the floor could impair the controls. If the hatch were to fail for any reason, there was a high probability the plane would be lost. In addition, Douglas had chosen a new type of latch to seal the cargo hatch. This possibility of catastrophic failure as a result of this overall design was first discovered in 1969 and actually occurred in 1970 in a ground test, both of which McDonnell-Douglas knew about. This information, and the 1972 "Applegate Memo", came to light in the material supplied to the litigants after the 1974 crash. McDonnell-Douglas had ignored these concerns, because rectification of what Douglas considered to be a small problem with a low probability of occurrence would have seriously disrupted the delivery schedule of the aircraft, likely causing Douglas to lose sales.

McDonnell-Douglas subsequently faced multiple lawsuits for the crash of Flight 981 by the families of the victims and others. In its defense during pretrial proceedings, McDonnell-Douglas attempted to blame the FAA for not issuing an airworthiness directive, Turkish Airlines for modification of the cargo door locking pins, and General Dynamics for an incorrect cargo door design. When it became clear that its defenses were unlikely to prevent a finding of liability, McDonnell-Douglas and Turkish Airlines and other associated parties settled out-of-court for an estimated $100 million (equivalent to $ million in ), including $80 million from McDonnell-Douglas, of which $18 million was paid by its insurer, Lloyd's of London.

After the crash of Flight 981, the latching system was completely redesigned to prevent them from moving into the wrong position. The locking system was mechanically upgraded to prevent the handle from being forced into the closed position without the pins actually being in place, and the vent door was altered to be operated by the pins, thereby indicating that the pins themselves, rather than the handle, were in the locked position. Additionally, the FAA ordered further changes to all aircraft with outward-opening doors, including the DC-10, Lockheed L-1011, and Boeing 747.  These changes included requiring vents be cut into the cabin floor to allow pressures to equalize in the event of a blown-out door, thus preventing a catastrophic collapse of the aircraft's cabin floor and other structures that could damage the control cables for the engine, rudder, and elevators.

Turkish Airlines continued using the "Flight 981" designator but for a different flight, Ercan to Antalya as of February 2023.

Similar accidents

Aircraft other than DC-10s have also suffered catastrophic cargo hatch failures. The Boeing 747 has experienced several such incidents, the most noteworthy of which occurred on United Airlines Flight 811 in February 1989, when a cargo hatch failure caused a section of the fuselage to burst open, resulting in the deaths of nine passengers who were blown out of the aircraft.

The NTSB's recommendations, issued following the earlier Flight 96 incident, were intended to reduce the risk of another hatch failure but were not implemented by any airline. As a result, the NTSB now communicates its recommendations for safety improvements directly to the FAA, which, though not obligated to take any subsequent action, may then issue Airworthiness Directives based on those recommendations.

Dramatization
The crash of Turkish Airlines Flight 981 was covered in 2008 in "Behind Closed Doors", a Season Five episode of the internationally syndicated Canadian TV documentary series Mayday, which also covers the similar 1972 incident on American Airlines Flight 96.

Footage of the incident appeared in the film Days of Fury (1979), directed by Fred Warshofsky and hosted by Vincent Price.

See also

List of notable decompression accidents and incidents
List of airliner crashes involving loss of control
Aloha Airlines Flight 243
Japan Air Lines Flight 123
United Airlines Flight 811
American Airlines Flight 96, a flight that suffered the same type of cargo door failure on a DC-10.
1975 Tân Sơn Nhứt C-5 accident

Note

References

Further reading
Destination Disaster, by Paul Eddy et al., Quadrangle, The New York Times Book Company, 1976. .
 The Last Nine Minutes, The Story of Flight 981, by Moira Johnston, Morrow, 1976. .
Air Disaster, Vol. 1, by Macarthur Job, Aerospace Publications Pty. Ltd. (Australia), 2001. , pp. 127–144.

External links

 
  Final Report (Archive, Alternate) – French Secretariat of State for Transport – Translation by the United Kingdom Department of Trade Air Accidents Investigation Branch, February 1976.
  Final Report (Archive, Alternate, Archive of Alternate) – Original report by French Secretariat of State for Transport (Secrétariat d'État aux Transports) – Posted by the Bureau of Enquiry and Analysis for Civil Aviation Safety (BEA)
 
 

Airliner accidents and incidents caused by design or manufacturing errors
Airliner accidents and incidents caused by in-flight structural failure
Airliner accidents and incidents involving in-flight depressurization
Aviation accidents and incidents in 1974
Aviation accidents and incidents in France
981
1974 in France
Accidents and incidents involving the McDonnell Douglas DC-10
March 1974 events in Europe
Aviation accidents and incidents caused by loss of control